This is a list of notable recording artists known for performing various types of Caribbean music.

Antigua and Barbuda

 Burning Flames
 El-A-Kru

The Bahamas

Baha Men
Ronnie Butler
Exuma
"King" Eric Gibson 
Joseph Spence
T-Connection

Barbados

Alison Hinds
Arturo Tappin
Dennis Bovell
Cavite Chorale
Cover Drive
Draytons Two
Grynner
Krosfyah
Charles D. Lewis
Jackie Opel
Lord Radio
Gabby
Rayvon
Red Plastic Bag
Rihanna
Barbados Police Band
Rupee
Schofield Pilgrim
Shontelle
The Merrymen

Cuba

Dominica

Exile One
Gramacks
Lazo
Swingin' Stars
The Gaylords
The Wizzard
Windward Caribbean Kulture (W.C.K.)

Grenada

Ajamu
Mighty Sparrow

Guadeloupe

Kassav'

Haiti

Jamaica

Montserrat

Arrow
Justin (Hero) Cassell

Saint Lucia

Nicole David

Saint Kitts and Nevis

Joan Armatrading

Saint Vincent and the Grenadines

Beckett
Jamesy P
Kevin Lyttle
Mattafix
New Direction
Skarpyon

Trinidad and Tobago

André Tanker
Anslem Douglas
Marlon Asher
Atilla the Hun 
Babla & Kanchan
Billy Ocean
Beenie Man
Black Stalin
"Boogsie" Sharpe/Earl Brooks
Bunji Garlin
Calypso Rose
Chalkdust
Charles D. Lewis
Crazy
David Rudder
Denise Belfon
Denyse Plummer
Destra Garcia
Drupatee Ramgoonai
Haddaway
Heather Headley
Heeralal Rampartap
Ken Greene
KES the Band
KMC
Lennox Mohammed
Lionel Belasco
Lord Beginner
Lord Invader
Lord Kitchener
Lord Melody
Lord Mouse and the Kalypso Katz
Maximus Dan
Mighty Shadow
Mighty Sparrow
Mighty Spoiler
Nicki Minaj
Phase II Pan Groove
Ras Shorty I
Rikki Jai
Roaring Lion
Adesh Samaroo
Jit Samaroo
Hazel Scott
Shurwayne Winchester
Sugar Aloes
Sundar Popo
Superblue (Blueboy)
Xtatik (w/Machel Montano/Mad Bull Crew)
Rakesh Yankaran

Virgin Islands

Iyaz
Midnite

See also
Carnival Road March